Tiridates (Parthian: 𐭕𐭉𐭓𐭉𐭃𐭕, Tīridāt, Trdat) is a word of Iranian origin (“given by the god Tir”). It may refer to:

Parthia
 Tiridates I of Parthia (fl. 211 BC), brother of Arsaces I
 Tiridates II of Parthia, ruled c. 30–26 BC
 Tiridates III of Parthia, ruled c. 35-36

Armenia
 Tiridates I of Armenia, ruled c. 56-59 and 62-88
 Tiridates II of Armenia, ruled from 217 to 252
 Tiridates III of Armenia, ruled 287–330, also known as Tiridates the Great
 Tiridates (fl. 4th century), a prince from the Bagratuni dynasty, husband of the Arsacid Princess Eranyak
 Trdat the Architect (c. 950–1020), chief architect of the Bagratuni dynasty

Others
 Tiridates (fl. 2nd century), a contemporary of Sohaemus of Armenia
 Trdat of Iberia, also known as Tiridates of Iberia, ruled c. 394-406